The Blobjob is an educational adventure video game developed by Detonium Interactive, released by insurance company Sampo in November 1998 for Microsoft Windows.

Plot and gameplay 
The player is Joe Ridley, a security officer of the NanoBlob Corporation who needs to prevent an intruder from stealing a piece of technology that will adversely harm the world.

During the game, the player is given a device that minituarises items in their pockets, which Finnish Video Games: A History and Catalog argues is one of the only times the endless inventory space is justified in-game.

The game features a series of static screens, has live actors, and does not allow the player to save.

Critical reception 
Richard Cobbett of PC Gamer deemed it "the strangest edutainment game I've ever played". Muropaketti felt the clumsy full-motion video product would bring new appreciation to  hand drawn pixel art. Michał Czajkowski felt its desire to appeal to the lowest common denominator made it lack challenge 

The game won the Grand Prize of the Mindtrek Multimedia Competition in Tampere.

References

External links 
 The Blobjob at MobyGames
 Article in Skrolli (page 42), a Finnish computer magazine

1998 video games
Adventure games
Educational video games
Full motion video based games
Single-player video games
Video games developed in Finland
Windows games
Windows-only games